Sphaerodactylus storeyae, also known commonly as the Isle of Pines sphaero or the Los Canarreos geckolet, is a small species of gecko, a lizard in the family Sphaerodactylidae. The species is endemic to Isla de la Juventud in Cuba.

Etymology
The specific name, storeyae, is in honor of American herpetologist Margaret Hamilton Storey.

Habitat
The preferred habitats of S. storeyae are forest and shrubland.

Reproduction
S. storeyae is oviparous.

References

Further reading
Grant C (1944). "New sphaerodactyls from Cuba and the Isle of Pines". Herpetologica 2: 118–125. (Sphaerodactylus storeyae, new species, p. 125).
Hedges SB, Garrido OH (1993). "A New Species of Gecko (Sphaerodactylus) from Central Cuba". Journal of Herpetology 27 (3): 300–306. (Sphaerodactylus storeyae, p. 300). (in English, with an abstract in Spanish).
Rösler H (2000). "Kommentierte Liste der rezent, subrezent und fossil bekannten Geckotaxa (Reptilia: Gekkonomorpha)". Gekkota 2: 28–153. (Sphaerodactylus oliveri storeyae, p. 114). (in German).
Schwartz A (1961). "A Review of the Geckoes of the Sphaerodactylus scaber Group of Cuba". Herpetologica 17 (1): 19–26. (Sphaerodactylus oliveri storeyae, new combination, p. 25). 
Schwartz A, Henderson RW (1991). Amphibians and Reptiles of the West Indies: Descriptions, Distributions, and Natural History. Gainesville, Florida: University of Florida Press. 720 pp. . (Sphaerodactylus oliveri storeyae, p. 518).

Sphaerodactylus
Endemic fauna of Cuba
Reptiles of Cuba
Reptiles described in 1944
Taxa named by Chapman Grant